Events from the year 1760 in Denmark.

Incumbents
 Monarch – Frederick V
 Prime minister – Johan Ludvig Holstein-Ledreborg

Events

Undated
 Rinderpest epidemic and the beginning of the rinderpest eradication.

Births
 19 January – Marie Kofoed, businessperson and philanthropist (d. 1838)
 11 February – Juliane Marie Jessen, author and translator (d. 1832)
30 November – Catharine Frydendahl, opera singer (d. 1831)

References

 
Years of the 18th century in Denmark
Denmark
Denmark
1760s in Denmark